Royal French foreign regiments were enlisted abroad for French service during the 17th and 18th centuries. Coming mainly from Switzerland, Germany, Ireland, and Wallonia they gave a significant contribution to the French military effort. Swedish and Polish regiments were counted as German, Scottish as Irish. After the French Revolution the foreign regiments were in 1791 merged with the indigenous French regiments to new, numbered, regiments of the line.

Danish regiments 
Régiment de Yoel 
Raised 1690
→ 1692: Régiment de Royal Danois (disbanded 1698)

Irish regiments 

Régiment de Berwick 
Raised 1698 
→ 1791: 88ème régiment d’infanterie de ligne

Régiment de Dillon 
Raised 1690 
→ 1791: 87ème régiment d’infanterie de ligne

Régiment de Clare 
Raised 1691 
→ 1691: Régiment de Clare
→ 1694: Régiment de Lee 
→ 1730: Régiment de Bulkeley 
→ 1775: Merged with Régiment de Dillon

Régiment d' O'Brien 
Raised 1689 
→ 1706: Régiment d' O'Brien 
→ 1720: Règiment de Clare
→ 1775: Merged with Régiment de Berwick

Régiment de Dorrington 
Raised 1698 
→ 1718: Régiment de Rooth 
→ 1766: Régiment de Roscommon 
→ 1770: Régiment de Walsh 
→ 1791: 92ème régiment d’infanterie de ligne

Régiment de Lally 
Raised 1744 
→ 1762: Merged with Régiment de Dillon

Régiment d’Ogilvy 
Raised 1747 
→ 1770: Merged with Régiment de Clare

Régiment de Royal Écossais 
Raised 1744 
→ 1762: Merged with Régiment de Bulkeley

Wallonian regiments 
Régiment de Solre 
Raised 1698 
→ 1711: Régiment de Beaufort 
→ 1721: Régiment de Bouffler 
→ 1727: Régiment de La Valliére 
→ 1741: Régiment de Guise 
→ 1747: Régiment d’Escars
→ 1749: Merged with Régiment de Tournaisis (French regiment) 

Régiment de Boufflers-Wallon 
Raised 1744:  disbanded 1748)

Régiment d’Hoquerie (liégeois) 
Raised 1629 
→ 1661 Rég de Grammont (French regiment)
 

Régiment de Horion 
Raised 1757 – Disbanded : 1762

Régiment de Miromesnil 
Raised: 1664 – Disbanded : 1714

Régiment de Royal Liégeois 
Raised: 1787 
→ 1791 101ème régiment d’infanterie de ligne

Régiment de Vierzet (liégeois) 
Raised: 1757 – Disbanded : 1762

Régiment de Royal-Wallon 
Raised 1734  - Disbanded 1748

German regiments 
Régiment d’Alsace 
Raised 1656
→ 1791: 53ème régiment d’infanterie de ligne

Régiment de Lowendahl 
Raised 1743 
→ 1760: Merged with Régiment d’Anhalt

Régiment de Fürstenberg 
Raised 1668 
→ 1686: Régiment de Greder 
→ 1716: Régiment de Sparre 
→ 1720: Régiment de Saxe 
→ 1751: Régiment de Bentheim 
→ 1759: Régiment d’Anhalt 
→ 1783: Régiment de Salm-Salm 
→ 1791: 62ème régiment d’infanterie de ligne

Régiment de Bergh 
Raised 1744 
→ 1760: Merged with Régiment d’Alsace

Régiment de Bouillon 
Raised 1757 
→ 1791: 98ème régiment d’infanterie de ligne

Régiment de Fersen 
Raised 1745 
→ 1754: Régiment de Nassau-Usingen 
→ 1758: Merged with Régiment de Nassau

Régiment de Saint Germain
Raised 1747 
→ 1760: Merged with Régiment de Nassau

Régiment de Nassau-Saarbrück 
Raised 1745 
→ 1758: Régiment de Nassau 
→ 1791: 96ème régiment d’infanterie de ligne

Régiment de Leisler 
Raised 1690 
→ 1694: Régiment de Sparre
→ 1714: Régiment de Lenck  
→ 1734: Régiment d’Appelgrehn 
→ 1742: Régiment de Royal Suèdois 
→ 1791: 89ème régiment d’infanterie de ligne

Régiment de Königsmarck (Konigsmarck) 
Création 1680 
→ 1686: Régiment de Surbeck
→ 1693: Régiment de Fürstemberg (Furstemberg)
→ 1697: Régiment de La Marck
→ 1791: 77ème régiment d’infanterie de ligne

Régiment de Royal Bavière 
Raised 1709 
→ 1780: Règiment de Royal Hesse Darmstadt  
→ 1791: 94ème régiment d’infanterie de ligne

Régiment de Royal Deux Ponts 
Raised 1757 
→ 1791: 99ème régiment d’infanterie de ligne

Régiment de Royal-Pologne 
Raised 1747 - Disbanded :  1763

Swiss regiments 

Régiment de Stoppa le Jeune 
Raised 1677 
→ 1692: Régiment de Surbeck 
→ 1714: Régiment de Hemel 
→ 1729: Régiment de Bezenwald 
→ 1741: Régiment de La Cour au Chantre  
→ 1749: Régiment de Grandvillars  
→ 1749: Régiment de Balthazar  
→ 1754: Régiment de Planta  
→ 1760: Régiment d’Arbonnier  
→ 1763: Régiment de Jenner  
→ 1774: Régiment d’Aulbonne  
→ 1783: Régiment de Châteauvieux  
→ 1791: 76ème régiment d’infanterie de ligne

Régiment de Greder 
Raised1673 
→ 1714: Régiment d’Affry   
→ 1734: Régiment de Wittmer  
→ 1757: Régiment de Waldner 
→ 1783: Régiment de Vigier  
→ 1791: 69ème régiment d’infanterie de ligne

Régiment de Salis 
Raised 1672 
→ 1690: Régiment de Pollier  
→ 1692: Régiment de Reynold  
→ 1702: Régiment de Castellas (Castella)  
→ 1722: Régiment de Bettens  
→ 1739: Régiment de Monin  
→ 1756: Régiment de Reding  
→ 1763: Régiment de Pfyffer  
→ 1768: Régiment de Sonnenberg  
→ 1791: 65ème régiment d’infanterie de ligne

Régiment d’Erlach 
Raised 1671 
→ 1694: Régiment de Manuel  
→ 1701: Régiment de Villars-Chandieu  
→ 1728: Régiment de May  
→ 1739: Régiment de Bettens  
→ 1751: Régiment de Jenner  
→ 1762: Régiment d’Erlach  
→ 1782: Régiment d’Ernest  
→ 1791: 63ème régiment d’infanterie de ligne

Régiment de Stoppa le Vieux 
Raised 1672 
→ 1701: Régiment de Brendle  
→ 1738: Régiment de Seedorf  
→ 1752: Régiment de Boccard  
→ 1782: Régiment de Salis-Samade  
→ 1791: 64ème régiment d’infanterie de ligne

Régiment de Salis-Soglio 
Raised 1690 
→ 1702: Régiment de May  
→ 1715: Régiment du Buisson  
→ 1721: Régiment de Diesbach  
→ 1791: 85ème régiment d’infanterie de ligne

Régiment de Pfyffer 
Raised 1672 
→ 1689: Régiment d’Hessy  
→ 1729: Régiment de Burky  
→ 1737: Régiment de Tschudy  
→ 1740: Régiment de Vigier  
→ 1756: Régiment de Castellas  
→ 1791: 66ème régiment d’infanterie de ligne

Régiment de Courten 
Raised 1690 
→ 1791: 86ème régiment d’infanterie de ligne

Régiment d’Eptingen 
Raised 1758 
→ 1783: Régiment de Schönau (Schonau)  
→ 1786: Régiment de Reinach  
→ 1791: 100ème regiment d’infanterie de ligne

Régiment de Karrer 
Raised 1719 
→ 1752: Régiment de Hallwyl 
→ 1763 Merged with Régiment de Béarn (French regiment)

Régiment de Lochmann 
Raised 1758 
→ 1777: Régiment de Muralt  
→ 1782: Régiment de Steiner  
→ 1791: 97ème régiment d’infanterie de ligne

Régiment de Travers 
Raised 1734 
→ 1740: Régiment de Salis-Soglio  
→ 1744: Régiment de Salis Mayenfeld  
→ 1762: Régiment de Salis-Marchlin  
→ 1791: 95ème régiment d’infanterie de ligne

References
 Leinhart, Constant. & Humbert, René. Les Uniformes de L'Armée Française. Leipzig: M. Ruhl, 1902. Retrieved 2017-08-06.
  Recueil de toutes les troupes qvi forment les Armees francoises. Nuremberg: Gabriel Nicolas Raspe, 1761. Universitätsbibliothek Augsburg. Retrieved 2017-02-12.
 Uniformed de l'Armée Royale Française. 1780. Bibliothèque nationale de France. Retrieved 2017-08-06.
France
Foreign regiments in French Service